Thomas Grøgaard (born 8 February 1994) is a Norwegian football defender who currently plays for Strømsgodset.

Club career

Odd

He played youth football for Kragerø, but joined Odd's youth team after the 2009 season. In mid-2012 he signed for the senior team. He made his senior league debut in August 2013 in a 1–1 draw against Molde. His first goal at senior level came against the Finnish team Mariehamn in a first round Europa League qualifier that ended with a 2-0 victory on June 30, 2016.

Brann

Grøgaard originally signed a deal with Brann effectively from January 2019, but Brann decide to buy him in the summer transfer window.

Strømsgodset

Grøgaard signed a deal until the end of the 2023 season with Strømsgodset on 31 August 2021.

International career

He was called up to the Norwegian national team for the first time ahead of a friendly match against United Arab Emirates on 27 August 2014, where he made his debut as a substitute in a 0-0 draw.

Career statistics

Club

References

1994 births
Living people
People from Kragerø
People from Arendal
Norwegian footballers
Odds BK players
SK Brann players
Eliteserien players
Association football defenders
Norwegian Second Division players
Norway youth international footballers
Norway under-21 international footballers
Norway international footballers
Sportspeople from Agder